Christian Nielsen (born 1967) is a Canadian politician who serves as the Member of the Legislative Assembly of Alberta for the provincial riding of Edmonton-Decore. He was elected in the 2015 Alberta election with 68% of the popular vote. Within the Legislature, Nielsen serves on a number of standing committees, such as the Standing Committee on Resource Stewardship. He was previously the deputy chair of the Standing Committee on the Alberta Heritage Savings Trust Fund, a committee devoted to oversight of Alberta's "rainy day" fund, built from past natural resource revenue.

Background
Nielsen was born in Winnipeg, Manitoba in 1967, before moving to Edmonton in 1982 with his family. He was educated at Northern Alberta Institute of Technology (NAIT), where he attended from 1986 to 1988. After his education, Nielsen held jobs in the industrial sector, and was a shipping receiver at a Lucerne Foods icecream plant prior to being elected as an MLA.

Electoral history

2019 general election

2015 general election

References

1960s births
Alberta New Democratic Party MLAs
Living people
Politicians from Edmonton
Politicians from Winnipeg
21st-century Canadian politicians